The 1996 Major League Baseball postseason was the playoff tournament of Major League Baseball for the 1996 season. The winners of the League Division Series would move on to the League Championship Series to determine the pennant winners that face each other in the World Series. 

In the American League, the New York Yankees and Cleveland Indians returned for the second consecutive year, the Baltimore Orioles returned to the postseason for the first time since 1983, and the Texas Rangers made their first postseason appearance in franchise history. 

In the National League, the San Diego Padres returned to the postseason for the first time since 1984, the St. Louis Cardinals made their first appearance since 1987, the Atlanta Braves made their fifth consecutive postseason appearance, and the Los Angeles Dodgers made their second straight appearance.

The postseason began on October 1, 1996, and ended on October 26, 1996, with the Yankees defeating the defending champion Braves in six games to capture their first title since 1978. It was the Yankees' 23rd title in franchise history.

Playoff seeds
The following teams qualified for the postseason:

American League
 New York Yankees - 92–70, Clinched AL East
 Cleveland Indians - 99–62, Clinched AL Central
 Texas Rangers - 90–72, Clinched AL West
 Baltimore Orioles - 88–74, Clinched Wild Card

Home-field advantage priority order: Central, West, East

National League
 Atlanta Braves - 96–66, Clinched NL East
 St. Louis Cardinals - 88–74, Clinched NL Central
 San Diego Padres - 91–71, Clinched NL West
 Los Angeles Dodgers - 90–72, Clinched Wild Card

Home-field advantage priority order: East, West, Central

Playoff bracket

American League Division Series

Cleveland Indians vs. Baltimore Orioles

This was the first postseason meeting between the Orioles and Indians. The Orioles knocked off the defending American League champion Indians in four games to advance to the ALCS for the first time since 1983. 

The first two games in Baltimore were dominated by the Orioles. The Orioles blew out the Indians in Game 1, and won Game 2 by three runs to go up 2-0 in the series headed to Cleveland. The Indians won Game 3 by five runs to avoid a sweep, however the Orioles narrowly prevailed in Game 4 after 12 innings of play.

Both the Orioles and Indians would meet each other again in the 1997 ALCS, which the Indians won in six games en route to the World Series.

Texas Rangers vs. New York Yankees

This was the first postseason meeting between the Rangers and Yankees. Despite taking Game 1 on the road, the Yankees came back to win three straight and advance to the ALCS for the first time since 1981. The Rangers and Yankees would meet again in the postseason, in 1998, 1999, and 2010, with the Yankees winning the former two and the Rangers winning the latter.

National League Division Series

San Diego Padres vs. St. Louis Cardinals

This was the first postseason meeting between the Cardinals and Padres. The Cardinals swept the Padres to return to the NLCS for the first time since 1987. Despite ending in a sweep, all three games were decided by two runs or less. The Cardinals took Game 1 by a 3-1 score, and then narrowly prevailed in Game 2 by one run to go up 2-0 in the series. The Cardinals would close out the series in San Diego with a narrow 7-5 win in Game 3.

The Cardinals and Padres would meet again in the NLDS in 2005 and 2006, as well as the Wild Card series in 2020. The Cardinals won the former two meetings, and the Padres won the latter.

Atlanta Braves vs. Los Angeles Dodgers

This was the first postseason meeting between the Braves and Dodgers. The Braves swept the Dodgers to advance to the NLCS for the fifth consecutive year. In Los Angeles, the Braves stole Game 1 on the road in extra innings, and then narrowly won Game 2 by a 3-2 score to go up 2-0 in the series. The Braves completed the sweep in Atlanta with a 5-2 victory in Game 3.

Both teams would meet in the postseason again four more times - in the NLDS in 2013 and 2018 (both won by the Dodgers), the NLCS in 2020 (won by the Dodgers), and 2021 (won by the Braves).

This was the last time the Dodgers appeared in the postseason until 2004.

American League Championship Series

New York Yankees vs. Baltimore Orioles

This was the first postseason meeting between the Yankees and Orioles. The Yankees defeated the Orioles in five games to advance to the World Series for the first time since 1981. 

Game 1 of the series became famous for the "Jeffrey Maier incident" - in the 8th inning of Game 1, rookie Derek Jeter hit a fly ball to deep right field off Armando Benítez. Right fielder Tony Tarasco backed up to the wall, but 12-year-old Yankees fan Jeffrey Maier reached over the fence and brought the ball into the stands and out of the field of play before Tarasco could attempt to catch the ball for a possible out. Tarasco immediately pointed above and protested that it was fan interference, but right field umpire Rich Garcia controversially ruled it a home run and his call was upheld by the other members of the umpiring crew. The Yankees would win Game 1 in 11 innings by a 5-4 score. In Game 2, the Orioles stole the home field advantage with a 5-3 victory to even the series headed back to Baltimore. However, the Yankees would win the next three games to secure the pennant.

This was the first of three consecutive losses in the ALCS for the Orioles - the next year, they would lose to the Cleveland Indians in six games, and in the 2014 ALCS they were swept by the Kansas City Royals. This was the first of six pennants won by the Yankees over the span of eight years - they would win it again in 1998, 1999, 2000, 2001, and 2003.

The Yankees and Orioles would meet again in the ALDS in 2012, which the Yankees won in five games before falling in the ALCS.

National League Championship Series

Atlanta Braves vs. St. Louis Cardinals

This was a rematch of the 1982 NLCS, which the Cardinals won in a sweep en route to winning the World Series. The Braves became the first team in NLCS history to overcome a 3-1 series deficit to win the series, and they returned to the World Series for the fourth time in six years. 

Games 1 and 2 in Atlanta were split by both teams. When the series moved to St. Louis, the Cardinals narrowly won Games 3 and 4 by one run each to go up three games to one in the series. However, their lead would not hold, as in Game 5, the Braves decimated the Cardinals in a 14-0 rout in front of their home crowd to send the series back to Atlanta. The Braves won Game 6 by a 3-1 score, and then again blew out the Cardinals in another lopsided shutout, 15-0, to secure the pennant for a second consecutive year.

The Braves and Cardinals would meet again three more times in the postseason — during the 2000 NLDS, 2012 NL Wild Card Game, and 2019 NLDS — with the Cardinals winning all three match-ups.

The Cardinals would return to the NLCS in 2000, but they fell to the New York Mets in five games.

1996 World Series

New York Yankees (AL) vs. Atlanta Braves (NL) 

This was the third World Series meeting between the Braves and Yankees. The Braves won in 1957, while the Yankees won in 1958 after trailing 3 games to 1 in the series. The Yankees, after trailing 2 games to none in the series, upset the defending World Series champion Braves in six games to win their first title since 1978.

At first, it appeared as if the Yankees were no match for the defending champion Braves. In the first World Series games played in the Bronx in 15 years, the Braves blew out the Yankees by a 12-1 score, and then prevailed in Game 2 by a 4-0 shutout thanks to a stellar pitching performance by Greg Maddux to go up 2-0 in the series headed back to Atlanta. However, the Yankees would take Game 3 by a 5-2 score to get on the board in the series for the first time. Game 4 was an offensive duel which the Yankees won by an 8-6 score to even the series at two. The Yankees narrowly prevailed in a 1-0 shutout in Game 5 to go up 3-2 in the series headed back to the Bronx. In Game 6, the Yankees jumped out to a 3-0 lead early, and while the Braves cut their lead to one in the top of the ninth, the Yankees ultimately prevailed to secure the title. 

These two teams would meet in the World Series once more in 1999, which the Yankees won in a sweep.

The Yankees would eventually become a dynasty, as they returned to the World Series in 1998, 1999 and 2000, winning all three to pull off a three-peat. The Braves wouldn't win the World Series again until 2021, where they defeated the Houston Astros in six games.

References

External links
 League Baseball Standings & Expanded Standings - 1996

 
Major League Baseball postseason